Human Rights Review is a quarterly peer-reviewed academic journal established in 1999. It publishes research articles about human rights from various disciplinary perspectives using diverse methodologies. In addition, the journal welcomes pieces on human rights commentary from a practitioner's perspective as well as manuscripts concerning human rights education and research methods and resources. As an inter-disciplinary journal, Human Rights Review includes theoretical, historical and empirical analyses of human rights issues and covers topics such as the moral and political interpretation and application of human rights legislation, terrorism, genocide, human security, sovereignty, globalization, cultural diversity, gender, human rights dilemmas in health care, and economic development. The editor-in-chief is Steven D. Roper (Florida Atlantic University).

Abstracting and indexing
The journal is abstracted and indexed in:

See also 
 Universal Declaration of Human Rights
 International human rights law

External links 
 

Human rights journals
Springer Science+Business Media academic journals
Publications established in 1999
English-language journals
Quarterly journals